The Italian irredentism in Istria was the political movement supporting the unification to Italy, during the 19th and 20th centuries, of the peninsula of Istria. It is considered closely related to the Italian irredentism in Trieste and Fiume, two cities bordering the peninsula.

History

Istria, since Roman times, has been an eastern region of Italy, populated by romanized people who were initially related to the Roman Empire and -after the Middle Ages- to the Republic of Venice. In the northeastern section of Istria after Charlemagne started to settle some Slav people, who increased in number inside all Istria mainly after the Turkish invasions of the Balkans (mostly as refugees).

When Napoleon defeated Venice in 1797, he found that Istria was populated by Italians on the coast and in the main cities, but the interior was populated mainly by Croats and Slovenians: this dual ethnicity in the same peninsula created a situation of antagonism between Slavs and Italians for the supremacy of Istria, when started the first nationalisms after Napoleon's fall.
Since 1815 Istria was a part of the Austrian monarchy, and Croats/Slovenians and Italians engaged in a nationalistic feud with each other.

As a consequence Istria has been the theater of an ethnic struggle between them, with bloody nationalistic wars, during the 19th and 20th centuries. The Italian irredentism was actively followed by many Italians in Istria, like the Italian hero Nazario Sauro of Capodistria.

Between 1918 and 1947 Istria was part of the Kingdom of Italy, but after World War II was part of Yugoslavia. Furthermore, after the war was created the Free Territory of Trieste in north-western Istria: in the years following the division of the territory between Italy and Yugoslavia, up to 40,000 Istrian Italians chose to leave the Yugoslav "B zone" and move to the "A zone" or Italy for various reasons - some were intimidated into leaving and some simply preferred not to live in Josip Broz Tito's Yugoslavia.

Since the end of World War II the irredentism has totally disappeared in Istria, in most part because of the Istrian exodus.

Istria is populated mainly by Slavs, but nearly 50,000 Italians still live there (divided between the areas of Istria belonging to Croatia, Slovenia and Italy).

Italian irredentism
After Napoleon the idea of "unification" of all the Italian people in a "united Italy" started to be developed by intellectuals like the Istrian Carlo Combi.  As a consequence, the Italian irredentism promoted the unification of those areas not included in the creation of the Kingdom of Italy after 1861: Istria was one of those.

The Italians in Istria (like Tomaso Luciani of Albona and many other "patriots") fully supported the Italian Risorgimento and, because of this, the Austrians saw the Italians as enemies and favored the Slav communities of Istria  During the meeting of the Council of Ministers of 12 November 1866, Emperor Franz Joseph I of Austria outlined a wide-ranging project aimed at the Germanization or Slavization of the areas of the empire with an Italian presence:

This fact created a huge emigration of Italians from Istria before World War I, reducing their percentage inside the peninsula inhabitants (they were more than 50% of the total population for centuries, but at the end of the 19th century they were reduced to only two fifth according to some estimates).

Indeed, in 1910, the ethnic and linguistic composition was completely mixed and the Italians were reduced to a minority in the Austrian province of Istria (even if huge). According to the Austrian census results, out of 404,309 inhabitants in the "Margravate of Istria", 168,116 (41.6%) spoke Croatian, 147,416 (36.5%) spoke Italian, 55,365 (13.7%) spoke Slovene, 13,279 (3.3%) spoke German, 882 (0.2%) spoke Romanian, 2,116 (0.5%) spoke other languages and 17,135 (4.2%) were non-citizens, which had not been asked for their language of communication.

But scholars like Matteo Bartoli complained that these census percentages included areas outside Istria (like the island of Veglia/Krk and the city of Castua/Kastav, a mostly Croatian town situated north of Fiume and outside the real Istrian peninsula): in his opinion the peninsula of Istria was still with a majority of Italians during World War I.
Generally speaking, Italians lived on coast, while Croats and Slovenes lived inland.

In the second half of the 19th century a clash of new ideological movements, Italian irredentism (which claimed Trieste and Istria) and Slovene and Croatian nationalism (developing individual identities in some quarters whilst seeking to unite in a South Slav bid in others), resulted in growing ethnic conflict between Italians one side and Slovenes and Croats in opposition. This was intertwined with the class and religious conflict, as inhabitants of Istrian towns were mostly Italian, whilst Croats or Slovenes largely lived out in the countryside even if in western and southern Istria there were many Italians in the agricultural areas.

Capodistria was the center of the irredentism in Istria. In this city there was the main Comitato istriano (Istrian Committee for Union to Italy), the meeting place of the most famous Istrian irredentists like Carlo Combi e Antonio Madonizza.  From there sailed in 1848 many Istrian Italians to fight for Venice against the Austrians with the Legione Istriano-dalmata.

After 1866 -when Venice and the Veneto region were united to Italy- in all Istria there was full support for the irredentism: Tino Gavardo, Pio Riego Gambini and Nazario Sauro where the most renowned between those who promoted the Istrian unification to Italy. Many of them enrolled voluntarily in the Italian Army during World War I against the Austrian Empire. Someone was captured and hanged by the Austrians, like the Italian national hero Nazario Sauro in August 1916.

In 1913 Pio Riego Gambini, Luigi Bilucaglia e Piero Almerigogna created the Fascio Giovanile Istriano, while in 1915 the Austrians interned in concentration camps nearly 100,000 Istrian Italians.

After Istria was united to Italy, following the Italian victory during World War I, some Istrian irredentists reached high levels of importance inside the Italian government, like general Vittorio Italico Zupelli, who was appointed minister. 

After WW2 there has been a huge exodus of Italian speaking people from Istria.

Actually there it is a growing movement in Italy (and Europe) toward asking for the official recognition of "genocide" or even democide of the Italians in Istria (like has been done with the Armenian massacre done by the Turks).

Indeed, there it is a long history of ethnic cleansing in Croatia 
and former Yugoslavia, as reported by many academics like R.J. Rummel

Notes

Bibliography
 Alberi, Dario. Istria - Storia, arte, cultura Lint Editoriale, Trieste, 1995 
 Bartoli, Matteo. Le parlate italiane della Venezia Giulia e della Dalmazia. Tipografia italo-orientale. Grottaferrata 1919.
 Benussi, Bernardo. L' Istria nei suoi due millenni di storia. Treves-Zanichelli. Trieste 1924.
 D'Alessio, Vanni. Il cuore conteso. Il nazionalismo in una comunità multietnica nell'Istria asburgica. Filema Edizioni, Napoli 2003
 Petacco, Arrigo. A tragedy revealed: the story of the Italian population of Istria, Dalmatia, and Venezia Giulia, 1943-1956. University of Toronto Press. Toronto, 2005 
 Pignatti Morano, Carlo. La vita di Nazario Sauro ed il martirio dell'eroe. Fratelli Treves Editori, Milano, 1922
 Večerina, Duško. Talijanski Iredentizam ( Italian Irredentism ) , Zagreb, 2001
 Vignoli, Giulio. I territori italofoni non appartenenti alla Repubblica Italiana. Giuffrè Editoriale. Milano, 1995.
 Vivante, Angelo. Irredentismo adriatico  Venezia, 1984

See also
 Italian irredentism
 Italian irredentism in Dalmatia

Italian irredentism
Istria
Political controversies